Kelvin McKnight Jr. (born April 25, 1997) is an American gridiron football wide receiver for the Seattle Sea Dragons of the XFL. He played college football at Samford. He played for the Denver Broncos and New England Patriots of the National Football League (NFL) and Winnipeg Blue Bombers of the Canadian Football League (CFL).

Professional career

Denver Broncos 
McKnight was signed to the Denver Broncos practice squad on October 23, 2019. He was waived by the Broncos on July 27, 2020.

Winnipeg Blue Bombers 
McKnight signed a one-year deal with the Winnipeg Blue Bombers on June 15, 2021. In his first season with the Bombers he played in eight games catching five passes for 96 yards. McKnight was released by the Bombers on June 16, 2022. About one month later he was re-signed by the Bombers on July 26, 2022, midway through the 2022 season. He was released from the practice roster on October 4, 2022.

Seattle Sea Dragons
McKnight was assigned to the Seattle Sea Dragons of the XFL on January 6, 2023.

References

External links 
 
 Winnipeg Blue Bombers profile
 Samford Bulldogs profile

1997 births
Living people
Sportspeople from Bradenton, Florida
Players of American football from Florida
American football wide receivers
Canadian football wide receivers
Samford Bulldogs football players
Denver Broncos players
New England Patriots players
Winnipeg Blue Bombers players
Seattle Sea Dragons players